The Victory Theatre (in stone on building, spelled "re") is a theater in Holyoke, Massachusetts.  It was built in 1920 by the Goldstein Brothers Amusement Company. The architecture is in the Art Deco style and is considered the last of its type between Boston and Albany. Closed for nearly four decades, as of November 2018 its owners, the Massachusetts International Festival of the Arts (MIFA), were in the process of obtaining permits and meeting construction contractors for renovation; by January 2019 the MIFA Victory Theatre group had its final architectural plans approved by the city planning board, along with construction fencing and signage special permits, with a goal of opening the theater by its 100th anniversary on December 20, 2020.

History

Samuel and Nathan Goldstein of Western Massachusetts Theatres Incorporated (at that time known as “G.B. Theatres”) were early pioneers in the movie business, having started in the first decade of the 20th century operating what were then known as “nickelodeons” which were storefront movie houses. Along with The Broadway Theatre in Springfield, the Victory represented their expansion into the “major leagues” as they rode the crest of the wave of the movies’ exploding popularity at the end of World War I. The Victory's name itself is a reference to the Allied Victory in the World War the year before on November 11, 1918. The Eagle Medallion at the center of the proscenium ties it all together.

In the 1920s these grand theatres were known as “presentation houses” and offered a combined bill of a silent film and a stage show on the same program and for a single admission price. The performances were often presented on a “continuous show” basis. The Victory Symphony Orchestra provided accompaniment for the film and music for the live show as well. The Grand Organ often substituted for the orchestra during matinee performances. The relatively shallow depth of the Victory's stage suggests that it was designed for “vaudeville” type acts presented along with a film, rather than fully mounted stage productions. The arrival of “talking pictures” in the late 1920s resulted in the eventual elimination of the live portion of the program.

The theater suffered fire damage in 1942.

The Victory continued to operate on a continuous show basis through the early 1970s, opening daily at 1:00 P.M. and running double feature film programs continuously until 11:00 P.M.

Ongoing restoration efforts

The theater closed in 1979 and has sat derelict since; in the mid-1980s the city government was able to obtain the property from a landowner delinquent on more than $50,000 in back taxes. A local group of activists, Save the Victory Theater Inc., led by Helen Casey worked with the city to raise funds to restore it, including help through industrialist Armand Hammer who put his private art collection on display for an exhibit to raise money for the project, netting about $450,000 (about $900,000 2017 USD) donated to the city's Victory Theatre Commission. At the time, an evaluation was made by the Massachusetts Historical Commission that building was eligible to be on the National Register of Historic Places; however the property remains unfiled with the Register and the original project, estimated at $4.5 million in restoration costs, never materialized.

However the Holyoke City Council, owners of the theater, agreed to hand ownership of the theater to the non-profit Massachusetts International Festival of the Arts, for $1,500 in 2009. The group hoped to restore and open the theater to performances in 2016, however the most recent announcement places the opening date at December 20, 2020. In 2017 the project was reported to have a $26 million commitment, however the cost of restoration has gone up considerably since 2009, rising from $27 million to $43 million due to deterioration of the building and operating cost estimates for the initial 5 years of its programming. In 2018 this cost was reported to have risen to $44.4 million however the group received $11 million in state bonds in addition to $2 million earlier authorized on top of $28.2 million in tax credits and donations, bringing the project in at approximately $41 million in commitments. MIFA has maintained it will move forward with construction in June 2019, and plans to open the theater in time for its 100th anniversary. On November 5, 2019, MIFA acquired a property abutting the theater, 134 Chestnut Street, for $224,000, which is expected to be razed as part of a planned larger complex attached to the Victory.

See also
 Holyoke Opera House, former historical theatrical venue
 Paramount Theater (Springfield, Massachusetts), NRHP historical theater in process of redevelopment
 Valley Arena, former sports and entertainment venue

References

External links
 Massachusetts International Festival of the Arts Victory Theatre
 Theater Competitive Analysis & Strategic Business Plan
 Victory Theatre, CinemaTreasures
 HLY.361 Victory Theater, Massachusetts Cultural Resource Information System (MACRIS)

Art Deco architecture in Massachusetts
Buildings and structures in Holyoke, Massachusetts
Theatres in Massachusetts
1920 establishments in Massachusetts